American singer Jeremih has released three studio albums, one extended play (EPs), three mixtapes and forty-eight singles (including thirty-seven as a featured artist).

Albums

Studio albums

Collaborative albums

Mixtapes

Extended plays

Singles

As lead artist

As featured artist

Other charted and certified songs

Guest appearances

Production discography

Notes

Music videos

As main artist

As featured artist

Notes

References

External links
 
 
 

Discographies of American artists
Rhythm and blues discographies